Dimitar Popgeorgiev Berovski (1840, Berovo, Ottoman Empire – 1907, Kyustendil, Kingdom of Bulgaria) was a Bulgarian revolutionary from Ottoman Macedonia.

He studied in Odessa where he met Georgi Sava Rakovski and fell under his influence. Later Berovski participated in Bulgarian legion in Belgrade. Then he worked as a Bulgarian teacher in Macedonia. For his anti - Greek Orthodox Church policy Berovski was jailed. For a brief period he became an adherent of the Bulgarian Greek Catholic Church.  Later he emigrated to Istanbul and became one of the members of the Bulgarian Exarchate. In 1876 Berovski was one of the leaders of Razlovtsi uprising. He also participated in the Russo-Turkish War (1877–1878) and was a leader of the Kresna-Razlog Uprising.

After that he еmigrated in Bulgaria and worked as Bulgarian police officer and district governor in Kyustendil, Tsaribrod and Radomir. Berovski took part in the Bulgarian unification and in the Serbo-Bulgarian War in 1885. Later he supported Internal Macedonian-Adrianople Revolutionary Organization (IMARO). Some of his personal belongings are kept in the monastery “St Archangel Michael” which serves as the city museum of Berovo.

See also
 National awakening of Bulgaria

Literature
 "Възвание към българските граждани", Кюстендил, 25 ноември 1897 година - After the Vinitsa affair, Dimitar Popgeorgiev issues a proclamation to the Bulgarian people, 1897.

References

1840 births
1907 deaths
People from Berovo
Bulgarian revolutionaries
19th-century Bulgarian people
Bulgarian educators
Mayors of places in Bulgaria
Bulgarian military personnel
Bulgarian people of the Russo-Turkish War (1877–1878)
People of the Serbo-Bulgarian War
Recipients of the Order of Bravery
Macedonian Bulgarians